Katja Hannchen Leni Riemann (born 1 November 1963) is a German actress.

The daughter of two teachers, Riemann grew up in Weyhe, near Bremen. After high school she went to Hamburg to study music and theater. She is the mother of actress Paula Riemann, whose father is Peter Sattmann.

Selected filmography

  (dir. Peter Beauvais, 1987, TV miniseries)
 Von Gewalt keine Rede (dir. , 1991, TV film)
 Regina auf den Stufen (dir. , 1992, TV miniseries)
  (dir. , 1993)
 Making Up! (dir. Katja von Garnier, 1993)
 Der bewegte Mann (dir. Sönke Wortmann, 1994)
 Over My Dead Body (dir. , 1995)
 Talk of the Town (dir. Rainer Kaufmann, 1995)
  (dir. Dennis Satin, 1996)
 Bandits (dir. Katja von Garnier, 1997)
 The Pharmacist (dir. Rainer Kaufmann, 1997)
 Comedian Harmonists (1997)
  (dir. Josée Dayan, 1999, TV film)
 Desire (dir. Colleen Murphy, 2000)
 Rosenstrasse (dir. Margarethe von Trotta, 2003)
 Agnes and His Brothers (dir. Oskar Roehler, 2004)
  (dir. Margarethe von Trotta, 2006)
  (dir. , 2006)
 Blood & Chocolate (2007)
 Runaway Horse (dir. Rainer Kaufmann, 2007)
  (2010, TV film)
  (2011)
 The Foster Boy (2011)
 The Weekend (2012)
  (2012, TV film)
  (2013, TV film)
 Fack ju Göhte (dir. Bora Dağtekin, 2013)
  (dir. Züli Aladağ, 2014, TV film)
 Coming In (dir. Marco Kreuzpaintner, 2014)
  (dir. Margarethe von Trotta, 2015)
 Look Who's Back (dir. David Wnendt, 2015)
 Fack ju Göhte 2 (dir. Bora Dağtekin, 2015)
 Too Hard to Handle (2016)
 SMS für Dich (dir. Karoline Herfurth, 2016)
 Fack ju Göhte 3 (dir. Bora Dağtekin, 2017)
 Forget About Nick (2017)
 Subs (dir. Oskar Roehler, 2018)
 Enfant Terrible (2020)

Awards
 1993 Bavarian Film Award, Best Actress
 1995 Bavarian Film Award, Best Actress
 1997 Bavarian Film Award, Best Film Score

References 

Bibliography
 Katharina Blum: Katja Riemann. Mit Charme und Power. Heyne, München 1998.

External links

Photographs of Katja Riemann

1963 births
Living people
People from Diepholz (district)
German television actresses
Best Actress German Film Award winners
Recipients of the Cross of the Order of Merit of the Federal Republic of Germany
Hochschule für Musik, Theater und Medien Hannover alumni
Volpi Cup for Best Actress winners
German film actresses
20th-century German actresses
21st-century German actresses